WMTC (730 AM) was a radio station broadcasting a Christian format. Formerly licensed to Vancleve, Kentucky, United States, the station was owned by the Kentucky Mountain Holiness Association. WMTC's format consisted of Southern Gospel music, as well as Christian talk and teaching programs such as; Revive our Hearts with Nancy Leigh DeMoss, Joni & Friends, Focus on the Family, and Unshackled!, as well as children's programming such as Adventures in Odyssey.

WMTC went off the air on February 20, 2013. The station's license was surrendered to the Federal Communications Commission (FCC) by the licensee on March 7, 2013, and the FCC cancelled WMTC's license on March 12, 2013.

References

External links
 
http://www.mountaingospel.org

MTC
Breathitt County, Kentucky
Moody Radio affiliate stations
Defunct radio stations in the United States
Radio stations established in 1948
1948 establishments in Kentucky
Radio stations disestablished in 2013
2013 disestablishments in Kentucky
Defunct religious radio stations in the United States
MTC